José Pedro Varela is a small city in the north of Lavalleja Department of southeastern Uruguay. It is named after the sociologist and politician José Pedro Varela.

Geography

History
A populated centre was founded here on 24 August 1898. On 1 February 1918, its status was elevated to "Pueblo" (village) by decree Ley N° 5.639 and on 16 October 1958 to "Villa" (town) by decree N° 12.553 It received the status of "Ciudad" (city) on 19 November 1967 by decree Ley Nº 13.631.

Population
In 2011, José Pedro Varela had a population of 5,118.
 
Source: Instituto Nacional de Estadística de Uruguay

Places of worship
 St. Charles Borromeo Parish Church (Roman Catholic)

References

External links
INE map of José Pedro Varela

Populated places in the Lavalleja Department
Populated places established in 1898